The following is an alphabetical list of topics related to the nation of Barbados.

0–9

 .bb–Internet country code top-level domain for Barbados
 +1 246 (area code)
 1898 Windward Islands Hurricane
 3Ws Oval
 2006 WGC-World Cup
 2010 Barbados Premier Division
 2011 Barbados Premier Division
 2014 Barbados Premier Division
 2014 Race of Champions
 2015 Barbados Premier Division
 2016 Barbados FA Cup
 2016 Barbados Premier Division
 2017 Barbados Premier League

A
ABC Highway
 Andromeda Gardens
 Anglican Church of Barbados
 Anglo-America
 Animal Flower Cave
 Architecture of Barbados
 Area code 246
 Army of Barbados
 Athletics Association of Barbados
 Atlantic Shores, Barbados
 Atlas of Barbados
 Attorney-General of Barbados
 Australia–Barbados relations

B
 Bajan
 Bajan Creole
 Bajan stick licking
 Banks Barbados Brewery
 Bank holiday
 Banks Sports and Cultural Club
 Bannatyne, Barbados
 Barbadian Brazilians
 Barbadian British
 Barbadian Canadians
 Barbadian Chess Championship
 Barbadian dollar
 Barbadian general election, 1946
 Barbadian general election, 1951
 Barbadian general election, 1956
 Barbadian general election, 1961
 Barbadian general election, 1966
 Barbadian general election, 1971
 Barbadian general election, 1976
 Barbadian general election, 1981
 Barbadian general election, 1986
 Barbadian general election, 1991
 Barbadian general election, 1994
 Barbadian general election, 1999
 Barbadian general election, 2003
 Barbadian general election, 2008
 Barbadian general election, 2013
 Barbadian National Heroes
 Barbadian nationality law
 Barbadian passport
 Barbadians
 Barbados
 Barbados and CARICOM
 Barbados Association for Children With Intellectual Challenges
 Barbados at the 2011 World Aquatics Championships
 Barbados at the 2013 World Aquatics Championships
 Barbados at the 2015 World Aquatics Championships
 Barbados at the 2017 World Aquatics Championships
 Barbados at the 2009 World Championships in Athletics
 Barbados at the 2011 World Championships in Athletics
 Barbados at the 2013 World Championships in Athletics
 Barbados at the 2017 World Championships in Athletics
 Barbados at the Commonwealth Games
 Barbados at the 2006 Commonwealth Games
 Barbados at the 2010 Commonwealth Games
 Barbados at the 2014 Commonwealth Games
 Barbados at the 2011 Commonwealth Youth Games
 Barbados at the Olympics
 Barbados at the 1968 Summer Olympics
 Barbados at the 1972 Summer Olympics
 Barbados at the 1976 Summer Olympics
 Barbados at the 1984 Summer Olympics
 Barbados at the 1988 Summer Olympics
 Barbados at the 1992 Summer Olympics
 Barbados at the 1996 Summer Olympics
 Barbados at the 2000 Summer Olympics
 Barbados at the 2004 Summer Olympics
 Barbados at the 2008 Summer Olympics
 Barbados at the 2012 Summer Olympics
 Barbados at the 2016 Summer Olympics
 Barbados at the 2010 Summer Youth Olympics
 Barbados at the 2014 Summer Youth Olympics
 Barbados at the Pan American Games
 Barbados at the 1995 Pan American Games
 Barbados at the 1999 Pan American Games
 Barbados at the 2003 Pan American Games
 Barbados at the 2011 Pan American Games
 Barbados at the 2015 Pan American Games
 Barbados at the Paralympics
 Barbados at the 2004 Summer Paralympics
 Barbados at the 2008 Summer Paralympics
 Barbados at the 2012 Summer Paralympics
 Barbados Bar Association
 Barbados Boy Scouts Association
 Barbados–Brazil relations
 Barbados–Canada relations
 Barbados Chamber Orchestra
 Barbados–China relations
 Barbados Coast Guard
 Barbados Community College
 Barbados Cricket Association
 Barbados Cricket Buckle
 Barbados Cycling Union
 Barbados Davis Cup team
 Barbados Defence Force
 Barbados Defence Force Sports Program
 Barbados Division One
 Barbados Fed Cup team
 Barbados Football Association
 Barbados–France Maritime Delimitation Agreement
 Barbados–France relations
 Barbados–Germany relations
 Barbados Gold Cup
 Barbados–Grenada relations
 Barbados–Guyana relations
 Barbados Independence Act 1966
 Barbados–India relations
 Barbados–Japan relations
 Barbados Jazz Festival
 Barbados Labour Party
 Barbados lottery
 Barbados men's national field hockey team
 Barbados men's national volleyball team
 Barbados Museum & Historical Society
 Barbados National Archives
 Barbados national basketball team
 Barbados national cricket team
 Barbados national football team
 Barbados national football team results
 Barbados national netball team
 Barbados National Oil Company Limited
 Barbados National Party
 Barbados National Pledge
 Barbados national rugby sevens team
 Barbados national rugby union team
 Barbados National Stadium
 Barbados National Trust
 Barbados nationality law
 Barbados–Nigeria relations
 Barbados Olympic Association
 Barbados passport
 Barbados – People's Republic of China relations
 Barbados Police Band
 Barbados Police Headquarters
 Barbados Police Service (BPS)
 Barbados Port Incorporated
 Barbados Postal Service
 Barbados Premier League
 Barbados Programme of Action
 Barbados rail
 Barbados Railway
 Barbados Red Cross Society
 Barbados Regiment
 Barbados Slave Code of 1661
 Barbados Stock Exchange
 Barbados–Suriname relations
 Barbados Tramway Company
 Barbados Transport Board
 Barbados Tridents
 Barbados – Trinidad and Tobago relations
 Barbados – United Kingdom relations
 Barbados–United States relations
 Barbados Water Authority
 Barbados Wildlife Reserve
 Barbados Workers' Union
 Barclays Park, Barbados
 Bath, Barbados
 Bathsheba, Barbados
 Battle off Barbados
 Baxters, Barbados
 Bayfield, Barbados
 Bayleys, Barbados
 Bel Air, Barbados
 Bellairs Research Institute
 Belleplaine
 Bentleys
 Bico Limited
 BIM
 Bissex
 Blades, Barbados
 Blades Hill
 Blue Waters, Barbados
 Boscobelle
 Bottom Bay
 Bowmanston
 Boxing Day
 Branchbury
 Breedy's, Barbados
 Brereton, Barbados
 Bridgetown – Capital of Barbados
 Bridgetown Heliport
 Bridgetown Market Street Fair
 Brittons Hill FC
 Bruce Vale
 Bruce Vale River
 Bushy Park, Barbados
 Bussa Emancipation Statue
 Bussa's rebellion

C
 Cabinet of Barbados
 Call signs in Barbados
 Callenders
 Calypso music
 Cambridge, Barbados
 Canadian High Commission, Bridgetown
 Canadians of Barbadian origin
 Cane Vale
 Capital of Barbados: Bridgetown
 Caribbean
 Caribbean Basin Trade Partnership Act
 Caribbean Broadcasting Corporation (CBC)
 Caribbean360
 Caribbean Community (CARICOM)
 Caribbean Court of Justice (CCJ)
 Caribbean Sea
 Caribbean Tourism Organization
 CaribVision
 CARICOM Regional Organisation for Standards and Quality
 CarIFS
 Carlisle Bay, Barbados
 Carlton Cricket Club (Barbados)
 Carrington, Barbados
 Castle Grant, Barbados
 Categories:
 :Category:Barbados
 :Category:Attorneys-General of Barbados
 :Category:Barbadian culture
 :Category:Barbadian people
 :Category:Barbados stubs
 :Category:Barbados-related lists
 :Category:Buildings and structures in Barbados
 :Category:Chief justices of Barbados
 :Category:Communications in Barbados
 :Category:Economy of Barbados
 :Category:Education in Barbados
 :Category:Environment of Barbados
 :Category:Geography of Barbados
 :Category:Government of Barbados
 :Category:Health in Barbados
 :Category:History of Barbados
 :Category:Law of Barbados
 :Category:Military of Barbados
 :Category:Politics of Barbados
 :Category:Society of Barbados
 :Category:Sport in Barbados
 :Category:Transport in Barbados
 commons:Category:Barbados
 Cathedral Church of Saint Michael and All Angels
 Catholic Church in Barbados
 Cave Bay, Barbados
 Cave Hill, Saint Lucy, Barbados
 Cave Hill, Saint Michael, Barbados
 CBC Radio (Barbados)
 CBC TV 8 (Barbados)
 Central Bank of Barbados
 Chalky Mount
 Chase Vault
 Chattel house
 Checker Hall
 Chefette
 Cherry Grove, Barbados
 Cherry Tree Hill, Barbados
 Chief Justice of Barbados
 Chimborazo, Barbados
 Christ Church, Barbados
 Christ Church Parish Church
 Christianity in Barbados
 Church Village, Barbados
 City of Bridgetown (BB Parliament constituency)
 Classical/Pops Festival
 Clement Payne Movement
 Clifton Hill Moravian Church
 Climate of Barbados

 Coat of arms of Barbados
 Codrington College
 Codrington School (Barbados)
 Combermere School
 Commonwealth of Nations
 Commonwealth realm of Barbados
 Communications in Barbados
 Congaline
 Congaline Carnival
 Congress of Trade Unions and Staff Associations of Barbados
 Congress Party (Barbados)
 Conset Bay
 Constant, Barbados
 Constituency Councils
 Constitution of Barbados
 Constitution River
 Continental island
 Coo-coo
 Corporate Affairs and Intellectual Property Office (CAIPO)
 Counterpart Caribbean
 Crab Hill, Barbados
 Crane Bay, Barbados
 Crop over
 Cubana Flight 455
 Cuisine of Barbados
 Culture of Barbados

D
 David Comissiong
 David Thompson
 Democratic Labour Party
 Demographics of Barbados
 DGM Barbados Open
 Diamond Corner
 Digicel Play
 Diocese of Barbados
 Discover Barbados TV
 Districts of Barbados
 Drax Hall Estate

E
 Economy of Barbados
 Eden Stars FC
 Education in Barbados
 Elections in Barbados
 Ellerton, Barbados
 Emancipation Day
 Embassy of Barbados in Washington, D.C.
 Empire Cricket Club
 Empire Theatre
 English colonization of the Americas
 English in Barbados
 English language
 Erdiston Teachers' Training College
 Errol Barrow
 Errol Barrow Day

F

 Falernum
 Fauna of Barbados
 Flying fish
 Flag of Barbados
 Flora of Barbados
 Flower Forest
 Fontabelle, Saint Michael, Barbados
 Football in Barbados
 Foreign relations of Barbados
 Francia Great House
 Frank Leslie Walcott
 Freemasonry in Barbados
 French Village, Barbados
 Freshwater Bay, Barbados
 Foul Bay, Barbados
 Foundation School (Barbados)
 Fourhill
 Four Roads, Barbados

G
 Garfield Sobers Gymnasium
 Garrison Historic Area
 Garrison Savannah
 Garrison Savannah Racetrack
 Geography of Barbados
 George Washington House (Barbados)
 The Girl Guides Association of Barbados
 Goodland, Barbados
 Gospelfest
 Government of Barbados
 Governor-General of Barbados
 Governors of Barbados
 Governors-General
 Graeme Hall Nature Sanctuary
 (Sir) Grantley Adams
 Grantley Adams International Airport
 Grave Yard, Barbados
 Greenland, Barbados
 Greenland Landfill, Barbados
 Gross domestic product
 Gun Hill Signal Station

H
 Harrison College (Barbados)
 Harrison's Cave
 Hastings, Barbados
 Health in Barbados
 Heroes' Day
 High Commission of Barbados, London
 High Commission of Barbados in Ottawa
 High Commission of Canada in Bridgetown
 Hillaby, Barbados
 History of Barbados
 HM Glendairy Prison
 Holetown
 Holder's Festival
 Hopewell, Christ Church
 Hopewell, Saint Thomas
 House of Assembly of Barbados
 Hugh Wooding Law School
 Human trafficking in Barbados
 Hunte's Gardens
 hurricanes, List of
 Husbands, Barbados

I
 Ilaro Court
 Immigration
 "In Plenty and In Time of Need"
 Indian River (Barbados)
 Indians in Barbados
 Industrial heritage of Barbados
 Institute of Chartered Accountants of Barbados
 International Organization for Standardization (ISO)
 ISO 3166-1 alpha-2 country code for Barbados: BB
 ISO 3166-1 alpha-3 country code for Barbados: BRB
 ISO 3166-2:BB region codes for Barbados
 International rankings of Barbados
 Internet in Barbados
 IPSC Barbados
 Irish immigration to Barbados
 Islam
 Islands of Barbados:
 Barbados island
 Culpepper Island
 Pelican Island (Barbados) (now absorbed into Barbados)

J
 Jesus Army Productions
 Joes River
 Judiciary of Barbados

K
 Kendal, Barbados
 Kensington Oval
 Knight or Dame of St. Andrew (Barbados)

L
 Lamberts, Barbados
 Landship
 Languages of Barbados
 Law enforcement in Barbados
 Hamble James Leacock
 Leeward Islands Airline Pilots Association
 Lesser Antilles
 LGBT rights in Barbados
 Lists related to Barbados:
 Diplomatic missions of Barbados
 List of airports in Barbados
 List of archives in Barbados
 List of Barbadian companies
 List of Barbadian cricketers
 List of Barbadian flags
 List of Barbadian organisations
 List of Barbados-related topics
 List of Barbados hurricanes
 List of beaches in Barbados
 List of birds of Barbados
 List of cathedrals in Barbados
 List of cities in Barbados
 List of cities, towns and villages in Barbados
 List of Colonial Secretaries of Barbados
 List of companies listed on the Barbados Stock Exchange
 List of companies of Barbados
 List of countries by GDP (nominal)
 List of diplomatic missions in Barbados
 List of diplomatic missions of Barbados
 List of Barbadians
 List of flag bearers for Barbados at the Olympics
 List of football clubs in Barbados
 List of Governors of Barbados
 List of Governors-General of Barbados
 List of High Commissioners of the United Kingdom to Barbados
 List of highways in Barbados
 List of hospitals in Barbados
 List of islands of Barbados
 List of lighthouses in Barbados
 List of locations in Barbados with an English name
 List of mammals of Barbados
 List of museums in Barbados
 List of newspapers in Barbados
 List of parliamentary constituencies of Barbados
 List of people on stamps of Barbados
 List of plantations in Barbados
 List of political parties in Barbados
 List of prime ministers of Barbados
 List of radio stations in Barbados
 List of rivers of Barbados
 List of schools in Barbados
 List of universities and colleges in Barbados
 List of universities in Barbados
 List of years in Barbados 
 Lloyd Erskine Sandiford Conference And Cultural Centre (less formally: Lloyd Erskine Sandiford Centre)
 Long Bay, Barbados
 Long Pond River (Barbados)
 Lord Radio & the Bimshire Boys

M
 Mangrove, Barbados
 Maple Club
 Marchfield
 Mártires de Barbados Stadium
 Maycock's Bay, Barbados
 Media in Barbados
 Metrication in Barbados
 Miami Beach, Barbados
 Mile and a Quarter
 Military of Barbados
 Ministries and Agencies of the Barbados Government
 Ministry of Foreign Affairs, Foreign Trade and International Business (Barbados)
 Ministry of Labour (Barbados)
 Miss Barbados
 Monarchy of Barbados
 Morgan Lewis Windmill
 Mount Gay Rum
 Mount Hillaby
 Multi-Choice TV (Barbados)
 Music history of Barbados
 Music of Barbados

N
 National anthem of Barbados
 National Cultural Foundation
 National Democratic Party
 National Heroes' Day
 National Heroes Square
 National Library Service of Barbados
 National symbols of Barbados
 National Union of Public Workers
 Nationality law of Barbados
 Needham's Point Lighthouse
 Notre Dame SC

O
 Official Gazette
 Oistins
 Oistins Bay
 Oistins Fish Festival
 Operation Red Dog
 Order of Barbados
 Our Lady Queen of the Universe Church, Barbados
 Outline of Barbados
 Owen Arthur
 Oxnards Crescent

P
 Palmetto Bay, Barbados
 Paradise FC (Barbados)
 Parishes of Barbados
 Parkinson Memorial Secondary School (Barbados)
 Parliament Buildings (Barbados)
 Parliament of Barbados
 Paynes Bay, Barbados
 People's Empowerment Party
 People's Political Alliance
 People's Progressive Movement
 Permanent Representative of Barbados to the United Nations in New York
 Pickwick Cricket Club
 Pico Teneriffe (Barbados)
 Pie Corner
 Pine Hill, Barbados
 Pinelands United SC
 Plantation Reserve
 Platinum Coast
 Politics of Barbados
 Port of Bridgetown
 Port Saint Charles
 Postage stamps and postal history of Barbados
 Postal codes in Barbados
 President of Barbados
 Pride of Gall Hill FC
 Prime Minister of Barbados
 Prime ministers of Barbados
 Project HARP
 Public Broadcast Service
 Public holidays in Barbados

Q
 Quality FM (Barbados)
 Queen Elizabeth Hospital
 Queen's College (Barbados)
 Queen's Park, Bridgetown (Barbados)
 Queen's Personal Barbadian Flag

R
 Ragged Point, Barbados
 REDjet
 Redleg
 Religion in Barbados
 Republic Bank
 Republicanism in Barbados
 Revenue stamps of Barbados
 Rihanna
 Ringbang
 Rock Hall, Barbados
 Roman Catholic Diocese of Bridgetown
 Rugby union in Barbados
 Rupee (musician)
 Ryan Brathwaite

S
 Saint Andrew, Barbados
 Saint Clement's Church, Barbados
 Saint George, Barbados
 Saint James, Barbados
 Saint John, Barbados
 Saint Joseph, Barbados
 Saint Joseph Hospital
 Saint Lawrence Gap
 Saint Lucy, Barbados
 Saint Martins, Barbados
 Saint Michael, Barbados
 Saint Peter, Barbados
 Saint Philip, Barbados
 Saint Thomas, Barbados
 Sam Lords, Barbados
 Samuel Jackman Prescod Institute of Technology
 Sandy Lane (resort)
 Scarborough, Barbados
 Scotland Formation, Barbados
 Scouting and Guiding in Barbados
 Senate of Barbados
 Sharon Moravian Church
 Sheraton Centre Mall
 Sherbourne, Barbados
 Sherbourne Conference Centre (see Lloyd Erskine Sandiford Conference And Cultural Centre)
 Shipping Association of Barbados
 Silver Sands FC
 Six Cross Roads, Barbados
 Six Men's Bay, Barbados
 Soca music
 Solar Dynamics
 South Point Lighthouse
 Speightstown
 Sport in Barbados
 Spouge
 St. Catherine Sport and Social Club
 St. James Church, Barbados
 St. John's Parish Church, Barbados
 St. Margaret's Church, Barbados
 St Nicholas Abbey
 St. Patrick's Cathedral, Bridgetown
 State House, Barbados
 States headed by Elizabeth II
 Statutory boards of the Barbadian Government
 Sunbeach
 Sunbury, Barbados
 Supreme Court of Barbados

T
 Table of precedence for Barbados
 Technico (Barbados football club)
 Telecommunications in Barbados
 The Alexandra School
 The Barbados Advocate
 The Castle, Barbados
 The Crane, Barbados
 The Daily Nation
 The Lodge School
 The St. Michael School
 Third Border Initiative
 Three Houses
 Timeline of Barbadian history
 Tourism in Barbados
 Transport in Barbados
 Treaty of Chaguaramas
 Tuk band
 Turner's Hall Woods
 Two Mile Hill, Barbados

U
 United Nations, member state since 1966
 United States-Barbados relations
 United States Naval Facility, Barbados
 University of the West Indies
 University of the West Indies, Cave Hill Campus
 UWI Blackbirds FC

V
 Vehicle registration plates of Barbados
 Venture, Barbados
 Verandah
 Visa policy of Barbados
 Visa requirements for Barbadian citizens
 Voice of Barbados

W
 Wanderers Cricket Club
 Wanstead, Barbados
 Warrens, Barbados
 Washington University of Barbados
 Welches, Barbados
 West Indian cricket team
 West Indians
 West Indies Federal Archives Centre
 West Terrace
 Weymouth Wales FC
 White Barbadian
 White Hill, Barbados
 WIBISCO
 
 Wildey
 Wildey Gymnasium
 Woodbourne, Barbados
 Workhall, Barbados
 Workers Party of Barbados

X

Y
 YMPC Cricket Club
 Youth Milan FC

Z
 ZR (bus)

See also

 
 
 
 
 Commonwealth of Nations
 List of Caribbean-related topics#Barbados
 List of international rankings
 Lists of country-related topics
 Outline of Barbados
 Outline of geography
 Outline of North America
 United Nations

References

External links

 

Barbados